Hanzhong (abbreviation: Han) is a prefecture-level city in the southwest of Shaanxi province, China, bordering the provinces of Sichuan to the south and Gansu to the west. 

The founder of the Han dynasty, Liu Bang, was once enfeoffed as the king of the Hanzhong region after overthrowing the Qin dynasty.  During the Chu-Han contention, Liu Bang shortened his title to the King of Han, and later used it as the name of his imperial dynasty.  In this way, Hanzhong was responsible for the naming of the Han dynasty, which was later hailed as the first golden age in imperial Chinese history and lends its name to the principal ethnic group in China.

Hanzhong is located at the modern headwater of the Han River, the largest tributary of the Yangtze River. The prefecture-level city consists of two urban district and nine rural counties. As of the 2020 census, its population was 3,211,462, of whom 1,084,448 lived in the built-up (or metro) area made of Hantai and Nanzheng districts.

History

Pre-Qin dynasty (before 220 BC)
There are few references to Hanzhong before the Qin dynasty's unification of China in 221 BC.  The Book of Documents refers to an area called Liangzhou, while Sima Qian's book Records of the Grand Historian speaks of a "Bao state" (where the ancient beauty Bao Si came from), both of which are believed to refer to the area now called Hanzhong.

From 900 BC, the area has been called Nanzheng.  The ancient geographical treatise entitled Shui Jing Zhu records that Duke Huan of Zheng, a vassal lord from the Western Zhou dynasty, was slain in a battle with the nomadic Quanrong people, and some of the Zheng citizens fled the capital to establish a new settlement to the south, giving rise to the area's name.  However, the veracity of this story is controversial.

Qin and Han dynasties (220 BC - 200 AD)

In the Qin dynasty the area was governed as the Hanzhong Commandery, whose seat was in current day Nanzheng County, south of the Hanzhong urban area.  In 207 BC, the Qin dynasty collapsed. Liu Bang, who would later become the founding emperor of the Han dynasty, was made lord of Hanzhong.  He spent several years there before raising an army to challenge his archrival, Xiang Yu, during the Chu–Han Contention.  In 206 BC, after the victory at Gaixia, Liu Bang named his imperial dynasty after his native district, as was customary.  However, he chose Hanzhong rather than his birthplace Pei County (present-day Xuzhou, Jiangsu Province).  Thus, Hanzhong gave its name to the Han dynasty.

In the second century AD, the Eastern Han dynasty gradually weakened. Outsiders from the Ba region attacked the Hanzhong area, as they had in the past.  The Han dynasty lost power. Zhang Lu, supported by followers of a Taoist sect, Way of the Celestial Masters, led an independent theocratic government in Hanzhong.  Thirty years later, after the Battle of Yangping, Zhang Lu surrendered Zanghong to the warlord, Cao Cao.

Prior to and during the Three Kingdoms period, Hanzhong was a militarily strategically important site.  It is located at a critical point along the route an army would take from the  Central Plain to the Sichuan Basin.  At this time, Cao Cao lost control of Hanzhong to Liu Bei, who assumed the title of King of Hanzhong.  Ruins and landmarks of the Three Kingdoms era remaining in Hanzhong include the tomb of the Shu Han chancellor Zhuge Liang.  Much of this period of Hanzhong's history is retold in the historical novel Romance of the Three Kingdoms.

Tang, Song, and Yuan dynasties (618-1368)
In Hanzhong, between the end of the Han dynasty and the beginning of the Tang dynasty there was political turmoil. In 784, when the capital, Chang'an (modern Xi'an) was captured, the Emperor Dezong of Tang fled to Hanzhong. During the Northern Song dynasty (960 - 1127), however, Hanzhong became economically wealthy with city tax revenue just behind that of regional capitals such as Kaifeng and Chengdu.

Ming and Qing dynasties, and the present (1368-present)
In 1331, during the Ming dynasty in the reign of the Hongwu Emperor, extensive renovations were made to Hanzhong's infrastructure. This work brought Zanghong to its present layout and form.

The Wanli Emperor (r. 1572-1620) installed his fifth son, Zhu Changhao, as king of Hanzhong. Changhao built a large, luxurious palace in what is now the Children's Park. The palace's Radiant Glass Wall was demolished during road construction in 1935. Since then, a 13.6 m section has been rebuilt on the eastern end of Sanpu Street.

In 1643, Zhu Changhao fled south to Sichuan ahead of Li Zicheng's rebel army. As he departed, his Hanzhong palace was looted. Qing dynasty historians remembered the massive but empty palace.

In December 1949, in the Chinese Civil War, Hanzhong was captured by the People's Liberation Army as the Communist Party of China conquered the Kuomintang.

Administration
The governance of Hanzhong, including the municipal executive, the legislature and the judiciary are located in Hantai District. The offices of the Communist Party of China and the Public Security Bureau are also located in Hantai District.

Hanzhong consists two urban districts and nine rural counties.

Economy

In 2021, the Hanzhong regional gross domestic product was 176.87 billion  yuan. The annual gross domestic product per capita was 55279 yuan.

Military industry
The 012 base was established in Hanzhong in the 1960s. It is responsible for military transport aircraft and Air-to-air missiles in Yangxian County.

Geography

Hanzhong is located in southwestern Shaanxi, near the border with Gansu and Sichuan Provinces. It is part of the Shannan region. Hanzong lies in the centre of the Hanzhong Basin, on the banks of the Han River (Hanshui).

The Daba Mountains rise to the south of the city. To the north are the Qin Mountains. These mountains make a northern geographical limit of southern China. However, officially, Shaanxi is part of the northwest. For more on the divisions between northern and southern China, see Northern and southern China.

The northern part of the prefecture is elevated while the southern part is generally low lying.

The Wuchiapingian Age in the Permian Period of geological time is named from Wuchiaping (from ) in the Liangshan area of Hanzhong.

Climate
Hanzhong has a temperate and humid climate. It is classified as humid subtropical (Köppen Cwa), with cool, damp winters and hot, humid summers.

The Qin Mountains to the north help shield the city from cold Siberian winds in the winter. Hence, the winter in Hanzhong is warmer than that at similar latitudes east of Shannan. This is despite Hanzhong's elevation and inland location.

The area is far more humid than central and northern Shaanxi. The chance of sunshine days per month varies from twenty-six percent in November and December to fifty percent in August. Hanzong receives 1,569 hours of bright sunshine each year.

Cityscape

Transport 

Hanzhong's transport needs are served by the Hanzhong Chenggu Airport and Yangpingguan–Ankang Railway. Hanzhong Airport provides air access to Beijing, Xi'an, Shanghai and Shenzhen with daily flights to each.

Hanzhong railway station lies in downtown Hanzhong, and is served by the Xi'an–Chengdu high-speed railway and Yangpingguan–Ankang railway lines.

Hanzhong is also part of a national system of highways. It joins the G5 Beijing-Kunming expressway and the G7011 Shiyan-Hanzhong-Tianshui expressway. National Highway 108, China National Highway 316, China National Highway 210 and the provincial roads 211 and 309 constitute the developed traffic network of Hanzhong.

Education 
At the end of 2012, Hanzhong had two hundred and seven middle schools and several centres of higher education. 
 Shaanxi University of Technology
 Shaanxi Aviation Vocational College
 Shaanxi Institute of Aeronautical Technology
 Hanzhong Vocational Technical College

Sights 

 Hanzhong Museum
 Zhangqian Memorial Museum 
 Baijiang Platform
 Ancient Hutou Bridge
 Qingmuchuan Ancient Town 
 Liping National Forest Park

See also 
 Janssen Pharmaceutica

References

External links 

 Hanzhong government website  
 Hanzhong (China) -- Britannica Online Encyclopedia

 
Prefecture-level divisions of Shaanxi
Cities in Shaanxi